The Volkswagen Lamando is a compact sedan manufactured by Volkswagen through its joint venture SAIC Volkswagen in China. It debuted at the Chengdu Auto Show in August 2014 and was launched in China in November 2014. The Lamando is positioned as the low-slung version of the Sagitar (Jetta outside China) in the country, as it is the case with the Volkswagen CC to the Passat.



First generation (2014)

Only front-wheel-drive is available. The 4-wheel disk brakes and electrically assisted steering is standard. Suspension is independent MacPherson struts at the front and an independent four-link suspension at the rear.

Export markets
The Lamando has been exported to the Philippines since 2018.

Lamando GTS
Styling wise, several design features have been enhanced on the GTS, including the front bumper with extra-large air intakes and the upper grille featuring a red GTI-like stripe and honeycomb grilles. The Lamando was used on the Chinese version of Top Gear as part of the Star in a Reasonably Priced Car segment in the second season, replacing the Ford Focus.

Second generation (2022) 

The second-generation Lamando was released in January 2022. Marketed as the Lamando L, the second generation model features the updated Volkswagen design language with design cues taken from recent Volkswagen models. The second generation model continues to be powered by the 1.4-litre turbocharged petrol engine producing .

References

External links

 (Philippines)

2010s cars
Lamando
Front-wheel-drive vehicles
Mid-size cars
Sedans
Cars of China
Cars introduced in 2014